The Forge of Vulcan may refer to:
"The Forge of Vulcan", a track on Quark, Strangeness and Charm
The Forge of Vulcan (Vasari), a painting by Giorgio Vasari